John Kenneth Blackwell (born February 28, 1948) is an American politician, author, and conservative activist who served as the mayor of Cincinnati, Ohio (1979–80), the Ohio State Treasurer (1994–99), and Ohio Secretary of State (1999–2007). He was the Republican candidate for governor of Ohio in 2006, the first African-American major-party candidate for governor of Ohio. He is currently a Senior Fellow for Family Empowerment with The Family Research Council.

Early life and education
Blackwell was born in Alliance, Ohio, the son of Dana, a part-time nurse, and George Blackwell, a meatpacker. He has two brothers, Carl and Charles. He married his wife Rosa in 1969 while he was in college. They have three children, Kimberly, Rahshann [Ohio Northern] Law School graduate), and Kristin.

Blackwell attended Xavier University in Cincinnati, Ohio on a football scholarship. He received a Bachelor of Science degree in psychology from Xavier in 1970 and his Master of Education degree, also from Xavier, in 1971. After college, he was invited to the Dallas Cowboys' training camp; he gave up football when told he would have to convert from linebacker to offensive lineman. He taught at Xavier from 1974 to 1991.

He has served as a trustee of Wilberforce University and Wilmington College.  On April 25, 1987 Kenneth Blackwell was made a Mason-on-Sight by Grand Master Odes J. Kyle Jr. of the Most Worshipful Prince Hall Grand Lodge of Ohio; thereby making him a Prince Hall Freemason. This African-American branch of Freemasonry was founded in the 19th century.

Political career

Blackwell became involved in politics through the Charter Committee, Cincinnati's third party. He was elected to and served on the Cincinnati city council.

In 1978, he was elected as Mayor of Cincinnati, serving into 1980. One of his first priorities was to establish a crowd control task force, to study better methods of crowd control and injury prevention. This was in response to the deaths of 11 concert fans at a concert by the British rock group The Who at Riverfront Coliseum on December 3, 1979.

When Blackwell began to consider statewide and national offices, he became a Republican. He was appointed to serve in the administration of President George H. W. Bush, as undersecretary in the Department of Housing and Urban Development from 1989 to 1990. He returned to Cincinnati to run for the first district seat in the United States House of Representatives which was being vacated by Tom Luken. Blackwell lost to Luken's son, Charlie Luken, by a narrow 51% to 49% margin. Following his close defeat, Blackwell was appointed by President Bush as US ambassador to the United Nations Commission on Human Rights. Blackwell served in that post from 1992 to 1993.

In 1994 Gov. George Voinovich appointed Blackwell as Ohio State Treasurer to complete the term of Mary Ellen Withrow. She had been appointed as U.S. treasurer by President Bill Clinton. Blackwell was elected treasurer in 1994 and was elected Ohio Secretary of State in 1998. That year, Blackwell considered a run for governor, but Ohio Republican Party chairman Robert T. Bennett persuaded Blackwell to run for secretary of state instead, leaving the governorship open to Bob Taft. Blackwell was national chairman of longtime friend Steve Forbes' presidential campaign in 2000. Blackwell was re-elected secretary of state in 2002.

Ohio Secretary of State

Involvement in the 2004 U.S. presidential election
As Secretary of State of a hotly contested swing state, Blackwell played a prominent role in the 2004 national election. He held the position of Chief Elections Officer, overseeing Ohio's elections process.

In testifying to Congress in 2005 about the conduct of the 2004 election in Ohio, Blackwell said that every Republican holder of statewide office in Ohio had been named as an honorary "co-chair" of the 2004 Bush campaign, that the position carried no responsibilities, and that previous Ohio Secretaries of State from both parties had held similar honorary positions.

Prior to the 2004 presidential election, Blackwell had announced he would enforce an Ohio State election law decreeing that any person who appeared at a polling place to vote but whose registration could not be confirmed would be given only a provisional ballot; if it were later determined that the person had attempted to vote in the wrong precinct, then their provisional ballot would not be counted. He directed poll workers to refuse to distribute provisional ballots unless they were satisfied as to the voter's residence. The Democratic party filed a lawsuit claiming that the policy was "intended to disenfranchise minority voters" and in violation of federal election law, specifically section 302 of the Help America Vote Act (HAVA).

On October 21, 2004, U.S. District Court Judge James G. Carr issued an order rejecting Blackwell's policy. Blackwell said that he would go to jail rather than comply. Blackwell appealed the decision to the United States Court of Appeals for the Sixth Circuit. On October 26, 2004, the Court of Appeals unanimously affirmed in part and reversed in part.

The court agreed with the plaintiffs and the District Court that Blackwell's directive violated HAVA to the extent that it empowered poll workers to withhold a provisional ballot based on their "on-the-spot determination at the polling place." The court ruled that if a subsequent review concluded that the voter was not entitled to vote in that precinct, then the provisional ballot would not be counted. (pdf) (pdf) In accordance with the Court of Appeals ruling, provisional ballots cast in the wrong precincts were not counted in Ohio's 2004 elections.

Democratic members of the U.S. House Committee on the Judiciary asked Blackwell to explain irregularities in the Ohio election in two letters, (pdf) (pdf) and requested his presence at a Public Congressional Hearing. (pdf) He did not attend the hearing, but responded to the first letter, refusing to comply with their requests for explanation, noting that he was already responding to requests from the Government Accountability Office and the Department of Justice. (pdf)

On December 27, 2004, Blackwell requested a court order to protect him from being interviewed in the Moss v. Bush case, a challenge of the presidential vote. He fought a subpoena, arguing that the litigation was frivolous.

List of legal suits and rulings
As Ohio Secretary of State, Blackwell has been a party to many election-related lawsuits. Some of these include:
 Moss v. Bush; Dismissed at request of plaintiff after certification of electoral votes
 Beacon Journal Publishing Company, Inc. and Charlene Nevada v. J. Kenneth Blackwell and the Board of Elections; Ohio was ordered to permit reporters to enter polling places during the Fall 2004 election, notwithstanding ORS § 3501.35.(pdf)
 Lucas County Democratic Party et al. v. Blackwell
 The Sandusky County Democratic Party v. J. Kenneth Blackwell; Blackwell was forced to pay nearly $65,000 in legal fees to the Sandusky County Democratic party.
 The League of Women Voters of Ohio et al. v. Blackwell
 Miller et al. v. Blackwell et al.
 Spencer v. Blackwell
 Summit County Democratic Central and Executive Committee et al. v. Blackwell et al.
 American Broadcasting Companies, Inc. et al. v. Blackwell
 State of Ohio Ex Rel. Matthew Wolf, et al. v. Blackwell
 Sarah White v. J. Kenneth Blackwell and the Board of Elections of Lucas County, Ohio
 Nader et al. v. Blackwell
 Schering v. Blackwell
 Ohio Democratic Party v. Blackwell; Upheld in federal appeals court in favor of Blackwell
 Anita Rios et al. v. Blackwell
 State ex. rel David Yost et al. v. National Voting Rights Institute et al.

Release of Ohio Social Security numbers
On March 1, 2006, Blackwell's office accidentally published a list of 1.2 million Social Security numbers of Ohio citizens on a website along with their business filings. A Federal class-action lawsuit was filed by Darrell Estep, who claimed that the release of the data had resulted in his Social Security number appearing  three times on the public website. The lawsuit was settled on March 28, 2006, after the numbers were removed from the website, a registration process was enacted to view the data, and Blackwell's office agreed to make monthly progress reports to the court. The data was part of a centralized voter database, required by Federal law. At that time, Blackwell promised to retain only the last four digits of the Social Security number in the database to prevent future problems.

But on April 26, 2006, Blackwell's office disclosed Ohio Social Security numbers again, mailing out computer disks containing the names, addresses, and Social Security numbers of 5.7 million registered voters in Ohio (80% of all registered voters in the state). The list was released as a standard practice under the Freedom of Information Act and Help America Vote Act. Blackwell's office apologized, saying that the release of the Social Security numbers was accidental and it attempted to recall all 20 of the disks. At least one recipient of the disks refused to comply.

Jim Petro, then Republican Attorney General of Ohio, launched an investigation into the disclosure, citing a legal requirement to "investigate any state entity where there may be a risk of a loss of private data." Blackwell stated that he considered the issue to be closed, but Petro disagreed, saying that he would use  "maximum due diligence" to ensure that the data was not copied before it was returned. Ohio law requires that individuals be notified if their Social Security numbers are compromised.

Diebold controversies
Ohio State Senator Jeff Jacobson asked Blackwell in July 2003 to disqualify Diebold Election Systems' bid to supply voting machines for the state, after security problems were discovered in its software.

On April 4, 2006, the Columbus Dispatch reported that Blackwell "owned stock [83 shares, down from 178 shares purchased in January 2005] in Diebold, a voting-machine [and ATM] manufacturer, at the same time his office negotiated a "deal" with the company. After discovering the stock ownership, Blackwell promptly sold the shares at a loss. He attributed the purchase to an unidentified financial manager at Credit Suisse First Boston who he said had, without his knowledge, violated his instructions to avoid potential conflict of interest.

When Cuyahoga County's primary was held on May 2, 2006, officials ordered the hand-counting of more than 18,000 paper ballots after Diebold's new optical scan machines produced inconsistent tabulations. The results of several local races were in limbo for days and eventually the recount resulted in a reversal of the outcome of one race for state representative. Blackwell ordered an investigation by the Cuyahoga County Board of Elections; Ohio Democrats demanded that Blackwell, due to his prior role in acquiring the Diebold equipment as well as his status as the Republican gubernatorial candidate in this election, recuse himself from the investigation due to conflicts of interest, but Blackwell did not do so.

2006 Ohio gubernatorial campaign

Campaign and national significance
Blackwell was the Republican nominee for Governor of Ohio in 2006. He beat state Attorney General Jim Petro in the 2006 Republican primary. (The current governor, Republican Bob Taft, could not run because of term limits.) Blackwell's opponents in the general election were Democratic Congressman Ted Strickland, Libertarian professor emeritus Bill Peirce, and Green Bob Fitrakis. Blackwell chose Ohio State Representative Tom Raga to be his running mate. Blackwell was the first African American to be nominated by a major political party as a candidate for the Ohio governorship.

There had been increased national attention on the ability of the Republican party to maintain control in Ohio. On a national level, The New York Times suggested that the results of the election would be a "bellwether" for the 2008 US presidential election.

Blackwell faced an uphill battle; according to a broad survey reported by The Plain Dealer on April 30, 2006, Ohio voters would "prefer to see a Democrat occupy the governor's mansion." Still, he had his supporters. John Stemberger, president and general counsel for the Florida Family Policy Council, was quoted as saying that Blackwell could "potentially be president of the United States someday, and the first black president at that." Blackwell's campaign relied heavily on accusations that Ted Strickland was not a resident of Ohio, and later that Ted Strickland was gay. Both of these accusations played heavily in campaign literature that failed to resonate with Ohio voters. Due to his poor management of this campaign, Blackwell's ability to compete on a national stage was called into question.

On November 7, 2006 Ted Strickland was elected Governor, defeating Blackwell by a 24% margin.

Conservative platform
Blackwell has taken some very conservative positions. In 2005, he supported keeping Terri Schiavo on life support indefinitely, saying, "I really do think that life is sacred, no matter how painful." When asked on Hardball with Chris Matthews if he would keep Schiavo on life support for 30 years, Blackwell said he would.

In his 2002 campaign for re-election to the post of Secretary of State, Blackwell took the position that he would favor abortions in the case where the life of the mother was at stake. He has since taken a more conservative position of opposing abortions even in the case where the mother's life is at risk.

May 2 primary
Blackwell won the Republican Primary on May 2, 2006 against Ohio Attorney General Jim Petro with 56% of the vote. The run up to the primaries was dominated by strongly critical television ads that Blackwell and his opponent Jim Petro ran against one another.

Blackwell was criticized by Petro, for declining to engage in three planned debates which had been organized by the Dayton Daily News and the City Club of Cleveland. The debate at the City Club of Cleveland occurred on April 25, 2006, despite Blackwell's absence. The event was originally scheduled to be broadcast on public television around Ohio. According to The Columbus Dispatch, "Blackwell said he has 'shared plenty of forums' with Petro and that he wants to focus on talking to Republicans in the final days of the campaign."

On April 29, the Hamilton County Democrats publicly demanded that Blackwell pull radio ads which urged unregistered Democrats to ask for Republican primary ballots on May 2, 2006 (rather than the issues-only ballot that unregistered voters normally get), and thereby become registered Republicans. The Democrats argued that the ads are using "illegal and unethical political tactics."

Campaign finance
During the primary, Blackwell led the Republican candidates in his ability to raise significant amounts of money for his campaign. He raised $1.09 million between January 31, 2006, and April 12, 2006, from approximately 12,000 individuals and businesses. This was nearly $800,000 more than his main competition, Jim Petro, but less than the $1.1 million raised by his main Democratic competition, Ted Strickland. Blackwell, along with 14 other candidates, (including Petro and Strickland) were accused by the Ohio Citizen Action group of failing to meet Ohio's campaign contribution law which requires best efforts to disclose the names, addresses, employment status, employer, and place of employment of individuals who donate $100 or more to a political campaign. Blackwell, Petro, and Strickland all received a "B letter grade" from the group for their levels of disclosure.

On April 16, 2006, the Toledo Blade reported that Blackwell had accepted more than $1 million in campaign contributions from "employees of firms seeking business with the statewide offices he's held over the past 12 years." Furthermore, the same organizations donated $1.34 million to the Ohio Republican Party, $1.29 million of which was forwarded directly to Blackwell's campaign fund. Several of the firms which have been awarded contracts from Blackwell's office have also been hired on to his gubernatorial campaign. The investigators argue that the suggestion of quid pro quo based on the actions of contributors raise an issue of a serious conflict of interest. Petro has responded by demanding that a law which bans political contributors from being awarded state contracts. Blackwell has stated that no illegal activity took place. In response to Petro's call for reform, Blackwell stated: "If you are asking me ... 'Am I advocating for campaign spending limits?' No. Never have. Never will."

After winning their respective primaries, both Blackwell and his Democratic opponent were able to raise record sums, in part because of the national attention paid to the race. As of September 9, 2006, Strickland led Blackwell, $11.2 million to $10 million.

Support from religious groups
Blackwell was well supported by many religious leaders in Ohio both politically and financially; according to campaign filings, Blackwell had received $25,031 from clergy, more than 27 times as much as Strickland.

However, on January 16, 2006, a group of 31 pastors, led by Rev. Eric Williams, pastor of North Congregational Church (United Church of Christ) in Columbus, Ohio wrote a 13-page letter to the IRS alleging that Blackwell has enjoyed "special treatment" by two Ohio "mega-churches," World Harvest Church and Fairfield Christian Church. The pastors accused the two organizations of sponsoring at least nine events with Blackwell as the sole invited politician, described as "partisan voter-registration drives," and of distributing biased voting guides. Rev. Russell Johnson, pastor of the Fairfield Christian Church in Lancaster, Ohio, defended his actions by saying that the event in question was not a "meet the candidate forum," but rather that he was giving Blackwell "an award for courageous leadership." Blackwell later called the group of 31 pastors "bullies."

On April 19, 2006, e-mails sent on behalf of the Blackwell campaign by Rev. Johnson on Easter Sunday, April 16, 2006, were reported by The Columbus Dispatch. Both the Blackwell campaign and Johnson, on behalf of Fairfield Christian Church, denied all wrongdoing. The e-mails in question subsequently were publicized on various online media outlets, clearly showing that the e-mails had been sent from within Johnson's church office on the evening of Easter Sunday to Church personnel and employees of the church-owned Fairfield Christian Academy.

As the two churches are 501(c)(3) tax-exempt, not-for-profit organizations, they are explicitly barred from campaigning for, endorsing candidates or "becoming involved in any activity which is beneficial or harmful to any candidate." Johnson and Rev. Rod Parsley, pastor of World Harvest church, have argued that the investigation was politically motivated and violated their constitutional right to free speech. Mark Everson, commissioner of the IRS responded, "you don't have an automatic or constitutional right to a tax exemption, and that's where the line has been drawn."

On May 7, 2006, the members of the Lord of Life Lutheran church in Columbus, Ohio, publicly complained that Blackwell's campaign workers placed fliers on the windshields of persons attending the church service on April 30, two days before the May 2 primary. The church pastor, Rev. Jim Wilson, stated "the tactic was offensive and suggested the church was endorsing Blackwell." Wilson said that he had tried to contact the Blackwell campaign in response to the incident but did not get a "satisfactory response." When questioned, Blackwell's campaign said the practice was "standard ... for Republicans and Democrats.">

On May 14, 2007, Blackwell was appointed a senior fellow at the well-known conservative religious, political group Family Research Council.

Support from pro-gun organizations
Blackwell has earned an "A" rating from the National Rifle Association's (NRA) Political Victory Fund. He is a member of the NRA's Board of Directors. Blackwell is also endorsed by the Ohio Gun Collectors Association, Ohioans for Concealed Carry and Gun Owners of America.

"I unequivocally support the Second Amendment right of every law-abiding Ohioan to keep and own firearms for hunting, personal protection and any other lawful purpose," said Blackwell. "I am proud to receive the NRA's highest rating and will be an unflinching advocate for gun owners as governor."

Bonuses
After Blackwell left office as Secretary of State, an audit found that he had awarded $80,534 in illegal bonuses to 17 employees.

RNC Chairman Election
Blackwell announced his intentions to run in the 2009 RNC Chairmanship Election, but withdrew after the 4th round of voting. He won early endorsement from the state chairmen in Louisiana (Roger F. Villere, Jr.), Texas (Tina Benkiser), and Oklahoma (Gary Jones).

RNC Chairman Vote
Source: CQPolitics, and Poll Pundit

 Candidate won that Round of voting
 Candidate withdrew
Candidate won RNC Chairmanship

Association with Family Research Council (FRC)

Family Research Council identifies Blackwell as a Senior Fellow for Family Empowerment. According to the organization's 2010 form 990 filing with the Internal Revenue Service, Blackwell was paid $162,000 as an independent contractor.

National Federation of Republican Assemblies (NFRA)
In October 2011, the National Federation of Republican Assemblies elected Blackwell their Executive Vice President at their Des Moines, Iowa Presidential Preference Convention.  Blackwell was re-elected in September 2013.

Involvement in Trump transition
During the presidential transition of Donald Trump, Blackwell led appointment selections for positions involving domestic issues.

Bibliography
 Rebuilding America: A Prescription for Creating Strong Families, Building the Wealth of Working People, and Ending Welfare. WND Books,  2006.  (with Jerome R. Corsi)
 The Blueprint: Obama's Plan to Subvert the Constitution and Build an Imperial Presidency. Lyons Press, 2010.  (with Ken Klukowski)

See also
 Election Results, U.S. Representative from Ohio, 1st District
 List of African-American Republicans

References

External links

 The Chicago Tribune: The anti-Obama
 Ken Blackwell's personal site – Ken Blackwell's personal site
 Hardball with Chris Matthews, March 22, 2005, Terri Schiavo case
 "Broadening the Field for 2008" by Tara Ross, The American Enterprise Online'', December 2, 2004, retrieved October 29, 2005.
 

1948 births
Living people
20th-century African-American people
21st-century African-American politicians
21st-century American politicians
21st-century evangelicals
2004 United States election voting controversies
2020 United States presidential electors
African-American mayors in Ohio
African-American people in Ohio politics
American evangelicals
American Freemasons
Black conservatism in the United States
Charter Party politicians
Christians from Ohio
Mayors of Cincinnati
Ohio Republicans
Secretaries of State of Ohio
State treasurers of Ohio
Wilberforce University
Xavier Musketeers football players